Samiullah Shinwari (born 31 December 1987) is an Afghan cricketer who represents Afghanistan in international level. He is a right-handed batsman and part-time leg break bowler. He made his international debut for Afghanistan in April 2009.

Career

Domestic career
Shinwari played for the then newly formed Afghan Cheetahs team in the Faysal Bank Twenty-20 Cup 2011-12. In the final group stage match of the 2018 Ghazi Amanullah Khan Regional One Day Tournament, he scored 192 not out, batting for Speen Ghar Region against Amo Region. He finished the tournament as the leading run-scorer, with 398 runs in six matches.

In September 2018, Shinwari was named in Paktia's squad in the first edition of the Afghanistan Premier League tournament.

International career
Shinwari is a part of the rapidly rising Afghan cricket team that in under a year has won the World Cricket League Division Five, Division Four and Division Three, thus promoting them to Division Two and allowing them to partake in the 2009 ICC World Cup Qualifier where they gained One Day International (ODI) status.

Shinwari was run out just one run short of his highest score in ODIs. He had scored 82 against Kenya in Amstelveen in 2010. This was his fourth fifty in ODIs and his first against a Test nation.

Asghar Stanikzai and Shinwari added 164 runs for the sixth wicket for Afghanistan which was the highest sixth-wicket partnership in the Asia Cup beating the 112 runs added by Alok Kapali and Mahmudullah against India at National Stadium, Karachi in 2008. The partnership was Afghanistan's highest for the sixth wicket in ODIs and their first century partnership for that wicket. Their previous highest partnership for the sixth wicket was 86 between Raees Ahmadzai and Shinwari against Scotland in Benoni in 2009. The partnership was also Afghanistan's third-highest partnership for any wicket and only their sixth hundred partnerships in ODIs.

In April 2019, Shinwari was named in Afghanistan's 15 man squad for the 2019 Cricket World Cup. In November 2019, he was named as the captain of Afghanistan's squad for the 2019 ACC Emerging Teams Asia Cup in Bangladesh.

On 6 March 2020, against Ireland in the first T20I, Shinwari completed 1000 T20I runs, thus becoming only the 4th Afghan player to reach 1000 T20I runs.

References

External links

1987 births
Living people
Afghanistan One Day International cricketers
Afghanistan Twenty20 International cricketers
Cricketers from Nangarhar Province
Afghan expatriates in Pakistan
Afghan Cheetahs cricketers
Khulna Tigers cricketers
Asian Games medalists in cricket
Cricketers at the 2010 Asian Games
Cricketers at the 2014 Asian Games
Cricketers at the 2015 Cricket World Cup
Cricketers at the 2019 Cricket World Cup
Boost Defenders cricketers
Spin Ghar Tigers cricketers
Asian Games silver medalists for Afghanistan
Medalists at the 2010 Asian Games
Medalists at the 2014 Asian Games
Paktia Panthers cricketers